Kamalasagar is one of the 60 Legislative Assembly constituencies of Tripura state in India. It is in Sipahijala district and a part of West Tripura Lok Sabha constituency.

Members of Legislative Assembly

 1972: Bichitra Mohan Saha, Indian National Congress
 1977: Matilal Sarkar, Communist Party of India (Marxist)
 1983: Matilal Sarkar, Communist Party of India (Marxist)
 1988: Matilal Sarkar, Communist Party of India (Marxist)
 1993: Matilal Sarkar, Communist Party of India (Marxist)
 1998: Narayan Chandra Chowdhury, Communist Party of India (Marxist)
 2003: Narayan Chandra Chowdhury, Communist Party of India (Marxist)
 2008: Narayan Chandra Chowdhury, Communist Party of India (Marxist)
 2013: Narayan Chandra Chowdhury, Communist Party of India (Marxist)

Election results

2018

See also
List of constituencies of the Tripura Legislative Assembly
 West Tripura district
 Kamalasagar
 Tripura West (Lok Sabha constituency)

References

West Tripura district
Assembly constituencies of Tripura